The 1898 municipal election was held December 12, 1898.  In previous elections, an entire town council had been elected at once for a one-year term; 1898 marked the beginning of staggered aldermanic terms, such that half of the six aldermen would be elected each year to two-year terms.  The mayor continued to be elected annually.

Because in the previous election all six aldermen had been elected to a one-year term, it was still necessary to elect six aldermen.  However, in order to set up the staggered terms, three were to be elected to one-year terms and three to two-year terms.

In addition to the city council, five public school trustees and four private school trustees were elected.

Voter turnout

Voter turnout figures for the 1898 municipal election are no longer available.

Results

(bold indicates elected, italics indicate incumbent)

Mayor

Aldermen
The election was held using Plurality block voting, where each voter could cast as many as six votes.

Public school trustees

Thomas Bellamy, James Ross, Colin Strang, Alex Taylor, and Hedley C. Taylor were elected.  Detailed results are no longer available.

Separate (Catholic) school trustees

N D Beck, Sandy Larue, Antonio Prince, and Georges Roy were elected.  Detailed results are no longer available.

References

City of Edmonton: Edmonton Elections

1898
1898 elections in Canada
1898 in Alberta